Rodrigo Pernambuco (born October 16, 1996) is a Brazilian volleyball player who plays for Sporting CP.

References

1996 births
Living people
Brazilian sportspeople
Brazilian men's volleyball players
Sporting CP volleyball players